The term Latin America and the Caribbean (LAC) is an English-language acronym referring to the Latin American and the Caribbean region. The term LAC covers an extensive region, extending from The Bahamas and Mexico to Argentina and Chile.

List of countries and territories by subregion 
Various countries within the Latin American and the Caribbean region don't use either Spanish, Portuguese or French as official languages, but rather English or Dutch.

Caribbean

Scattered island in the Caribbean Sea 

  Aves Island (Venezuela)

West Indies

Antilles

Greater Antilles 

  (United Kingdom)
 
 
 
 
 *
  (United States)

* Disputed territory administered by the United States, claimed by Haiti.

Lesser Antilles 

  (United Kingdom)
 
  Antigua
  Barbuda
 
  (United Kingdom)
 
 
  (Netherlands)
  (Netherlands)
 
 
 
  (Netherlands)
  (Netherlands)
  (Venezuela)
 
 
  (France)
  La Désirade
  Les Saintes
  Marie-Galante
  (France)
  (United Kingdom)
  (Venezuela)
  (France)
 
 
 
 
  Saint Martin (France)
 
  Saint Vincent
  Grenadines
  Spanish Virgin Islands (Puerto Rico)
 
  (United States)

Lucayan Archipelago 

 
  (United Kingdom)

Latin America

Central America 

 
 
 
 
 
 †
 
 

† The UN geoscheme includes Mexico in Central America.

Offshore islands 

  Bajo Nuevo Bank*
  (Colombia)
  Serranilla Bank*

* Disputed territories administered by Colombia, claimed by the United States.

South America 

 
 
 † (Norway)
 
 
 
 
 *
  (France)
 
 
 
 *
 
 
 

† The UN geoscheme includes Bouvet Island in South America instead of Antarctica or Africa.

* Disputed territories administered by the United Kingdom, claimed by Argentina.

Somewhat are included 

  (United Kingdom)
  (United Kingdom)
  (Chile)
  (Canada)
  (France)
  Salas and Gómez Island (Chile)

Economy
It is estimated to attribute for over 400 billion dollars that form the core for economic stability, however, a few countries, notably Venezuela, is a member state of OPEC.

Political situation
The region has a unique history and varied between stability to instability, included various deadly conflicts, though its level remains conflicted. The two deadliest conflicts in the region are the Colombian conflict and the Mexican drug war; and more recently, the crisis in Venezuela. Some other bloody conflicts include the internal conflict in Peru and gang wars in Argentina, Brazil, and Honduras. Other conflicts include the Mapuche conflict in Argentina and Chile; and the Insurgency in Paraguay. These conflicts, however, have received lesser attentions from international media, and varied by time, with Colombia in headline in 1990s, Mexico in the 2000s and currently, Venezuela.

Culture

Religion

Most countries are dominated by Christianity, the largest being Roman Catholic. Smaller groups include Protestantism (including Mormonism and Jehovah's Witnesses) and Orthodoxy and other forms of Christianity. There are many venerated folk saints and folk religions namely folk catholicism as well as african diaspora religions (syncretic african traditional religions) as well as Native American religions including shamanism. Many folk healers also practice folk magic. Specific Creole peoples often have their own religions/spiritual practices like the Maroons's Rastafari and Garifuna's belief system (or New Orleans Voodoo and Melungeon in North America).

Especially in the Caribbean, Central America and Brasil, there are Jewish (including Messianic Jews), Muslim, Hindu, Baháʼí Faith (especially in Panama, Bolivia and Belize), Buddhist, Shinto and Romani mythology, Chinese folk religion, Dravidian folk religion (among others) practitioners. The Muslims and especially Jews and Gitanos are often descendants of the peoples forced into Crypto-Judaism and Crypto-Islam (and even Crypto-Paganism, for lack of a better term) from the Reconquista. There most likely is Sikh and Jainist groups (and possibly even smaller Zoroastrianism, Samaritan and Druze groups). There is also a growing movement of unitarian universalism/new age/neo-paganism-type unorganized spirituality; goddess worship is especially popular with younger, often progressive people like feminists. Again, these movements are often also syncretic, such as Pachamama or other Pre-Columbian Deity worship. Atheism/Agnosticism is quite dichotomous with a few countries having high percentages, but most are small and may be growing slowly.

Music

The region is extremely popular for its own distinct music which can't be found somewhere in the world. Began since the conquest of Spain, France, Britain, the Netherlands and Portugal in 15th century, due to the greater diversification including indigenous, Asian, African and European population merged, it expanded popularity of their music, dated from 1950s and rampant globalization, music from the region has become widely noticed, and has been nominated for several music awards.

Sports
The region is rich at sporting activities, especially in association football, which have some of the world's strongest football teams, including Brazil, Argentina, Uruguay, and others. Baseball, tennis, cycling, volleyball, rugby union, basketball, hockey, and cricket are also popular.

The region is known for producing significant martial-arts fighters, notably competing in the Ultimate Fighting Championship.

See also
 Americas (terminology)
 Caribbean
 Central America
 Community of Latin American and Caribbean States (CELAC)
 Hispanic America
 Ibero-America
 Latin America
 Latin American and Caribbean Group
 Latin Americans
 Lucayan Archipelago
 North America
 Northern America
 South America
 United Nations Economic Commission for Latin America and the Caribbean
 United Nations geoscheme
 United Nations geoscheme for the Americas
 United Nations Statistics Division (UNSD)
 West Indies

References

External links 
 UN Statistics Division – Standard country or area codes for statistical use (M49)

Economic country classifications
Latin America
Caribbean
Acronyms
Regions of the Americas